This is an incomplete list of chicken breeds considered in Italy to be wholly or partly of Italian origin. Some may have complex or obscure histories, so inclusion here does not necessarily imply that a breed is predominantly or exclusively Italian.

 Ancona
 Bianca di Saluzzo
 Bionda Piemontese
 Ciuffine Ghigi
 Collo Nudo Italiano
 Ermellinata di Rovigo
 Italiana
 Livorno
 Mericanel della Brianza
 Millefiori di Lonigo
 Millefiori Piemontese
 Modenese
 Mugellese
 Padovana
 Padovana Riccia
 Pépoi
 Polverara
 Robusta Lionata
 Robusta Maculata
 Romagnola
 Siciliana
 Valdarno
 Valdarnese

References

Chicken